This is a list of Permanent Representatives of Panama to the United Nations.

 Germán G. Guardia J.; 1945-1947
 Mario de Diego; 1948-1950
 Eusebio A. Morales; 1952-1954
 Roberto de la Guardia; 1955-1957
 Alejandro Remón Cantera; 1957-1959
 Jorge E. Illueca; 1959-1960
 Enrique A. Jimenez; 1961-1962
 Aquilino Boyd; 1962-1976
 Jorge E. Illueca; 1976-1981
 Carlos Osores Typaldos; 1981-1983
 Aquilino E. Boyd; 1985
 David Samudio; 1985-1987
 Jorge Ritter; 1987-1988
 Leonardo Kam; 1988-1989
 Oscar E. Ceville; 1989-1989
 Eduardo Vallarino; 1990-1990
 Cesar Pereira Burgos; 1990-1992
 Jorge E. Illueca; 1994-1997
 Carlos Arosemena A.; 1997-1999
 Ramón Morales (diplomat); 1999-2004
 Ricardo Alberto Arias; 2004-2009
 Yavel Francis Lanuza; 2009
 Pablo Antonio Thalassinos; 2009-

References

External links 
  Permanent Mission of Panama to the United Nations

 
Panama
Lists of office-holders in Panama